The Frank was the currency of the Swiss canton of Solothurn between 1798 and 1850. It was subdivided into 10 Batzen, each of 4 Kreuzer or 10 Rappen. It was worth th the French silver écu or 6.67 g fine silver.

History

The Frank was the currency of the Helvetian Republic from 1798. The Helvetian Republic ceased issuing coins in 1803. Solothurn issued coins between 1805 and 1830. In 1850, the Swiss franc was introduced, with 1 Solothurn Frank = 1.4597 Swiss francs.

Coins
Billon coins were issued in denominations of 1,  and 5 Rappen, and 1 Batzen, with silver coins for 5 Batzen, 1 and 4 Franken, and gold 8, 16 and 32 Franken. The  Rappen was also denominated as 1 Kreuzer.

References

External links

Modern obsolete currencies
Currencies of Switzerland
1805 establishments in Switzerland
1850 disestablishments in Switzerland
Canton of Solothurn